Bullet in the Head is a song by American rock band Rage Against the Machine, released as the second single from their 1992 eponymous debut album. A fan favorite and one of the album's heaviest tracks, "Bullet in the Head" refers to the band's belief that the government uses media to control the population, drawing comparisons between typical residences and Alcatraz. The track was transferred intact from the band's demo, also titled Rage Against the Machine.

Both front and back images for the single's artwork were by the French photographer Marc Riboud.

In popular culture
"Bullet in the Head" is mentioned in the lyrics to Pennywise's "I Won't Have It", from their 1995 album About Time. In the booklet of the album, Zack de la Rocha's name is also mentioned next to the "Bullet in the Head" part. 

This song was to be the second performance on Rage Against the Machine's set during an April 1996 episode of Saturday Night Live. However, the band was kicked out after only one song for hanging inverted American flags from their amplifiers.

Music video
A video clip was recorded in a warehouse in New York. While not often cited, this isn't a mimed video, but a live performance recorded for the BBC's program The Late Show. In the words of Tom Morello, "The tour bus pulled up in front of the BBC studio, we ran through the song once in front of the cameras, then left to play a club that night." The video appeared on the band's self-titled DVD, released November 25, 1997 on Epic Records.

Track listing

Remix done by Sir J Jinx.

Charts

References

External links
 Official music video

Rage Against the Machine songs
1992 singles
1992 songs
Song recordings produced by Garth Richardson
Songs written by Tom Morello
Songs written by Brad Wilk
Songs written by Tim Commerford
Songs written by Zack de la Rocha
Epic Records singles